πρῶτος (Protos) is the twenty-seventh album by the Norwegian electronic dance music producer Aleksander Vinter, and his ninth using the alias "Savant". It was released on 8 August 2014.

Track listing
"Man of the Law" – 4:40
"Prototype" – 4:14
"Spaceship" – 3:33
"Rider In Red" - 2:07
"Fakers" - 3:22
"Rise Up" - 3:57
"Nebula" - 5:58
"Spaceheart" - 4:37
"Laser Sharks" - 4:03
"Cry for Love" - 3:40
"Samurai" - 3:38
"Quest" - 6:48
"Venom" - 5:09
"Super Sheriff" - 2:48
"Sword of Destiny" - 3:27
"Hit the Top" - 2:57
"Aquarius" - 5:10
"Beautiful World" - 3:28

References

External links

2014 albums
Savant (musician) albums